Michael Fitz from the TrellisWare Technologies, Inc., San Diego, California, was named Fellow of the Institute of Electrical and Electronics Engineers (IEEE) in 2015 for contributions to the theory and practice of multiple antenna radio.

References

External links
IEEE Explore Bio

Fellow Members of the IEEE
Living people
Year of birth missing (living people)
Place of birth missing (living people)
American electrical engineers